The 2019 Italian local elections will be held on different dates; most on 26 May 2019, together with the 2019 European election, with a second round on 9 June. Direct elections will be held in 3,843 out of 7,918 municipalities; in each of these, mayor and members of the City Council are going to be elected. Of the 3,841 municipalities, 30 are provincial capitals.

The elections in Sicily were held on 28 April, with a second ballot on 12 May.
The elections in Sardinia were held on 16 June with a second ballot on 30 June.

Voting system
All mayoral elections in Italy in cities with a population higher than 15,000 use the same voting system. Under this system, voters express a direct choice for the mayor or an indirect choice voting for the party of the candidate's coalition. If no candidate receives at least 50% of votes, the top two candidates go to a second round after two weeks. This gives a result whereby the winning candidate may be able to claim majority support, although it is not guaranteed.

The election of the City Council is based on a direct choice for the candidate with a preference vote: the candidate with the majority of the preferences is elected. The number of seats for each party is determined proportionally.

Municipal elections

Overall results
Majority of each coalition in the municipalities which have a population higher than 15,000 inhabitants:

Mayoral election results

References

2019 elections in Italy
 
 
Municipal elections in Italy
May 2019 events in Italy
June 2019 events in Italy